Zillur Rahman Siddiqui (23 February 1928 – 11 November 2014) was a Bangladeshi writer, academic and educationist.

Career
Siddiqui was a professor of English at Rajshahi University. He served as a Vice-Chancellor of Jahangirnagar University from 1976 to 1984.

Works
Siddiqui authored around 40 books in Bengali and English. He edited the literary quarterly Purbamegh. He edited the dictionary, Bangla Academy English-Bengali Dictionary.

Awards
 Alaol Sahitya Purashkar (1977)
 Bangla Academy Literary Award (1979)
 Independence Day Award
 Kazi Mahbub Ullah Begum Zebunnisa Trust Award (1990)
 Alokto Sahitya Purashkar (1998)
 MA Haque Swarna Padak (2003)

References

1928 births
2014 deaths
Academic staff of the University of Rajshahi
Bengali–English translators
Recipients of Bangla Academy Award
Recipients of the Independence Day Award
University of Dhaka alumni
20th-century translators
Vice-Chancellors of Jahangirnagar University
Advisors of Caretaker Government of Bangladesh